National Philatelic Museum may refer to

 National Philatelic Museum, New Delhi
 National Philatelic Museum, Philadelphia